PubPsych is a vertical open access information retrieval system for psychological resources, coordinated by the research support organization Leibniz Institute for Psychology Information (ZPID). The search interface is available in English, Spanish, French, and German.
PubPsych includes over 800.000 datasets and offers, where available, full-text linking, links to additional information and link resolving.

Cooperation Partners 
PubPsych is a joint project of cooperating organizations within Europe and the United States of America. Participating organizations are:
 Leibniz Institute for Psychology Information (ZPID), Germany,
 Institut de l'Information Scientifique et Technique (INIST-CNRS), France, 
 Consejo Superior de Investigaciones Científicas (CSIC), Spain, 
 National Academic Research and Collaborations Information System (NARCIS), Netherlands,
 National Library of Norway (NB), Norway,
 U.S. National Library of Medicine (NLM), US,
 Education Resources Information Center (ERIC), US.

Mission 
PubPsych offers free access to an expanding range of international databases including records not covered in commercial international databases.

Data Pool 
PubPsych indexes databases either fully or just Psychology relevant segments. The data pool consists of the following:

Fully indexing:
  PSYNDEX (Germany)
  PsychOpen (Germany)
  PsychData (Germany)
  ISOC-Psicología (Spain)

Indexing of Psychology relevant segments:
 PASCAL (France)
 NARCIS (Netherlands) 
 NORART (Norway)
 MEDLINE® (USA)
 ERIC (USA)

Update frequency 
According to own statements of the coordinating institute ZPID, the update frequency depends on the database, in average 6000 data records are getting added per month: 
 PsychOpen, PsychData (immediately after the release of new records)
 PSYNDEX, MEDLINE (weekly)
 ERIC, PASCAL, NARCIS (monthly) 
 ISOC-Psicología, NORART (quarterly)

See also 
 List of academic databases and search engines

References 
The information in this article is based on that in its German equivalent.

External links 
 English PubPsych Website
 Quick Reference Guide

Works about psychology
Bibliographic databases and indexes
Full-text scholarly online databases